The British Council Nepal is the UK's international organisation for cultural relations in Nepal. The head office is located in Lazimpat, Kathmandu. The organisation is basically focused on promoting English language and arranging English language tests (IELTS) in Nepal. The organisation was started in 1959 by establishing a public library in Kantipath; the library has been discontinued.

Budget
The budget of council to operate in Nepal is as follows.
April 2016 - March 2017 	£1,035,375
April 2017 - March 2018 	£804,058
April 2018 - March 2019 	£852,207
April 2019 - March 2020 	£1,303,098

Operation
Besides English language, the council is also involved in various social and educational activities. 
 A four-year program (2017 to 2021) named Dakchyata was started in coordination with Council for Technical Education and Vocational Training (CTEVT). The aim of this program was to produce human resource by combining Agriculture, Tourism and Construction sector.

Controversy
In January 2020, the organization was dragged into controversy for tax evasions. A complaint was filled in the Nepal parliament stating that the council has been operating for years without registering with the government and without paying any taxes.

External links
 Official Website

References

Cultural organisations based in Nepal
British Council
Organisations based in Nepal
1959 establishments in Nepal